The 1987 Long Beach State 49ers football team represented California State University, Long Beach during the 1987 NCAA Division I-A football season.

Cal State Long Beach competed in the Pacific Coast Athletic Association. The team was led by first-year head coach Larry Reisbig, and played home games at Veterans Stadium adjacent to the campus of Long Beach City College in Long Beach, California. They finished the season with a record of four wins and seven losses (4–7, 2–5 PCAA).

Schedule

Notes

References

Long Beach State
Long Beach State 49ers football seasons
Long Beach State 49ers football